Xzavie Lee HeBron Jackson [ex-ZAY-vee] (born September 21, 1984) is a professional gridiron football defensive end who is currently a free agent. He most recently played for the Cedar Rapids Titans of the Indoor Football League (IFL).He was signed by the Cincinnati Bengals as an undrafted free agent in 2007. He played college football at Missouri. He also played in the CFL with the Edmonton Eskimos in 2009.

Jackson has also been a member of the Philadelphia Eagles, RiverCity Rage, La Crosse Spartans and Cedar Rapids Titans.

Early life
Jackson attended Will C. Wood High School in Vacaville, California, and then Wichita Heights High School in Wichita, Kansas, where he played standout tight end.

Professional career

Edmonton Eskimos
Jackson played for the Edmonton Eskimos of the Canadian Football League in 2009. He recorded nine tackles, one sack, and one forced fumble that season, but was mostly remembered for attacking teammate Aaron Fiacconi with a shovel during practice.

Cedar Rapids Titans
Jackson signed with the Cedar Rapids Titans in 2012.

Nebraska Danger
Jackson signed with the Nebraska Danger on November 4, 2016. He signed on for the 2018 IFL season, announcing that it would be his last before retiring. Prior to the season's start, he had accumulated 77 sacks in his IFL career, the most in the league. Jackson finished the season injured, but in 11 games, he had accumulated 24 tackles, an interception, three forced fumbles, three fumble recoveries (including one for a touchdown), and a kickoff return for six yards. He also racked up 4.5 more sacks, adding to his league record for most career sacks with a new total of 81.5. For his statistics during this final season of play, he was named to the second team, All-IFL roster.

During the games he spent injured, Jackson transitioned into a coaching role for younger players, and assumed coaching duties full-time for the 2019 season.

References

External links
Missouri Tigers bio
Philadelphia Eagles bio
RiverCity Rage bio

1984 births
Living people
Players of American football from California
American football defensive ends
American players of Canadian football
Canadian football defensive linemen
Missouri Tigers football players
Cincinnati Bengals players
Philadelphia Eagles players
RiverCity Rage players
Sportspeople from the San Francisco Bay Area
Edmonton Elks players
La Crosse Spartans players
Cedar Rapids River Kings players
Tampa Bay Storm players
Iowa Barnstormers players
Nebraska Danger players
People from Vacaville, California